The Mendip Times is a monthly magazine, distributed free of charge in the Mendip Hills and surrounding areas of Somerset, England.

It was launched in 2005 and has three employees, who also produce Mendip TV.

The owner, Steve Egginton, is a former chair of the SW branch of the Society of Editors, head of news at HTV, and was formerly producer of BBC Points West and deputy news editor of the Western Daily Press.

References

Newspapers published in Somerset
Mendip Hills
Publications established in 2005